Dyschirius peruanus is a species of ground beetle in the subfamily Scaritinae. It was described by Fedorenko in 1991.

References

peruanus
Beetles described in 1991